Michael Benedetto (born June 2, 1947) is a Member of the New York State Assembly representing the 82nd Assembly District, which covers the Co-op City, Throggs Neck, Westchester Square, City Island, Country Club, and Pelham Bay sections of the East Bronx. After a 35-year teaching career at the elementary and secondary school level, he was first elected to the State Assembly in 2004. He is a member of the Democratic Party.

Benedetto was born in the Bronx in 1947. He holds a B.A. in History/Education from Iona College and a M.A. in Social Studies/Education. In 1981, Benedetto co-founded the Bronx Times-Reporter, a weekly newspaper, with John Collazzi.

Benedetto introduced a law prohibiting tackle football for ages 13 and under, in order to protect young children from concussion related developmental problems.

Benedetto first ran for office in 1976, losing to Republican Assemblyman Guy Velella. Two years later, Benedetto ran against Republican State Senator John D. Calandra and lost by 1,121 votes.

In 1980, Benedetto attempted to run again against Calandra. Bronx Democratic leaders, who maintained a non-aggression pact with Calandra, allowed him run in the Democratic primary. Calandra defeated Benedetto to win the Democratic nomination, and in the general election as the candidate of both the Republican and Democratic parties, Calandra easily defeated Benedetto, who ran on the Liberal Party ticket.

See also
 List of members of the New York State Assembly

References

External links
 New York State Assembly official site
 Michael Benedetto's Assembly web page

Living people
Politicians from the Bronx
Democratic Party members of the New York State Assembly
Iona University alumni
1947 births
21st-century American politicians